Pointe Hyacinthe is a village and a headland in the commune of Le Robert on the east coast of Martinique.

Populated places in Martinique